Yunjalu may refer to:
 Yunjalu, Ardabil
 Yunjalu, East Azerbaijan